Andrew Ahn (born 1985/1986) is an American film director and screenwriter who has directed the feature films Spa Night (2016), Driveways (2019), and Fire Island (2022).

Early life
Andrew Ahn was born and raised in Los Angeles. He is the son of Korean immigrants. He graduated from Brown University with a degree in English and received a Masters in Fine Arts (MFA) in Film Directing from the California Institute of the Arts (CalArts).

Career
In 2011, Ahn wrote, directed, edited and produced a short film entitled Andy, which won the Best Narrative Short award at the 2011 San Diego Asian Film Festival. The film has also screened at film festivals including the Boston Asian American Film Festival, the Slamdance Film Festival, the San Francisco International Asian American Film Festival, the Los Angeles Asian Pacific Film Festival, Outfest, the Hong Kong Lesbian and Gay Film Festival, the DisOrient Asian American Film Festival of Oregon and the Vancouver Asian Film Festival.

In 2012, Ahn wrote, directed, edited and produced a short film entitled Dol (First Birthday), which premiered at the 2012 Sundance Film Festival. It won awards including the Grand Jury Award Outstanding Narrative Short Film at Outfest: Los Angeles Gay and Lesbian Film Festival 2012, and a Jury Award for Best Narrative Short Film at the Polari: Austin Gay and Lesbian International Film Festival 2012. Ahn has stated that he made the film to come out to his parents as gay.

Ahn has also served as an editor on the documentary I Am Divine (2013) (directed by Jeffrey Schwarz) and was a post-production assistant on the documentaries Vito (2011) and Tab Hunter Confidential (2015), both of which were also directed by Jeffrey Schwarz.

Ahn raised funds via Kickstarter for his feature film, entitled Spa Night, about a closeted gay Korean-American teenager who follows his desires and finds more than he bargains for at the Korean spa in the Koreatown of Los Angeles. He developed the screenplay for the film at the 2013 Sundance Screenwriters Lab, which it was selected for, and participated in the Film Independent Screenwriting Lab and the Film Independent Directing Lab with the feature screenplay for the project. For developing the film, he also received a Sundance Institute Cinereach Feature Film Fellow grant.

Filmography
Spa Night (2016)
Driveways (2019)
Fire Island (2022)

References

External links

Andrew Ahn's Official Website
2012 Sundance Filmmakers: Andrew Ahn
The Sundance Diaries: I Made This Film to Come Out to My Parents

1980s births
21st-century American screenwriters
21st-century LGBT people
American film directors of Korean descent
Artists from Los Angeles
Brown University alumni
California Institute of the Arts alumni
Film directors from Los Angeles
American LGBT people of Asian descent
LGBT film directors
LGBT people from California
Living people
Year of birth missing (living people)